Cryogenine, also known as vertine or (10α)-4,5-dimethoxy-2-hydroxylythran-12-one, is a biphenylquinolizidine lactone alkaloid from the plants Sinicuichi (Heimia salicifolia) and H. myrtifolia. The compound has no psychoactive properties in humans up to 310 mg, but has shown anti-inflammatory activity similar to aspirin.

The freebase form melts at 250–251 °C and is soluble in moderately polar organic solvents such as chloroform, methylene chloride, benzene, and methanol, but is insoluble in water and petroleum ether.

In the development of thin layer chromatography plates with diazotized p-nitroaniline spray, cryogenine produces a purple spot (as does sinicuichine, another biphenylquinolizidine lactone alkaloid found in Heimia species).

See also 
 List of entheogens

References 

Alkaloids
Catechol ethers
Lactones
Alkene derivatives